The riots which took place at Aligarh which was continued from December 7 to 10. The riots is caused due to the communal tensions between Hindus and Muslims and lead to the deaths of 92 people

Cause of the riot
The violence is caused when Devotees carrying the ashes of the dead travelled throughout the state, including to Aligarh, thereby arousing tensions between the communities.

References

1990 riots
Riots and civil disorder in India
1990 in India